Hollywood can be either of the following places in the U.S. state of Pennsylvania:

Hollywood, Luzerne County, Pennsylvania
Hollywood, Montgomery County, Pennsylvania